A threaded insert, also known as a threaded bushing, is a fastener element that is inserted into an object to add a threaded hole. They may be used to repair a stripped threaded hole, provide a durable threaded hole in a soft material, place a thread on a material too thin to accept it, mold or cast threads into a work piece thereby eliminating a machining operation, or simplify changeover from unified to metric threads or vice versa.

Types
Thread inserts come in many varieties, depending on the application.  Threaded inserts for plastics are used in plastic materials and applied with thermal insertion or ultrasonic welding machines.

Manufacturers of ready-to-assemble furniture often ship the parts with threaded inserts and other kinds of knock-down fasteners pre-installed.

People who use sheet metal or sandwich panel or honeycomb sandwich-structured composite often install threaded inserts to spread shear, tension, and torque loads over a larger area of the material.

Captive nut
Captive nuts come in two basic styles. One type, the cage nut or clip-on nut is a conventional nut held captive by a sheet metal carrier that clips onto the part to be connected.  These are generally used to attach screws to sheet metal parts too thin to be threaded, and
they can generally be attached, removed and reused with simple hand tools.

The second type of captive nut is a threaded insert.  These are either pressed into holes in the material to be joined or moulded in. In either case, part of the insert is generally knurled to get a good grip on the material supporting the insert. One variant, the swage nut, has a knurled portion that swages the sides of a soft metal hole to more tightly grip the nut. Press fit and swaged captive nuts are used in panels that are too thin to be threaded or in soft materials that are too weak to be threaded. They are installed by pressing them in with an arbor press.

Threaded inserts are commonly used in plastic casings, housing, and parts to create a metal thread (typically: brass or stainless steel) to allow for screws to be used in the assembly of many consumer electronics and consumer products.  These may be cast in place in injection molded parts or they may be added by thermal insertion. In the latter, the insert is heated and then pressed into a hollow in the plastic part. The heat causes local melting in the plastic. Ultrasonic Insertion is the process used to apply vibration and pressure to install the threaded insert into a molded hollow boss (hole) of a plastic part. The ultrasonic vibrations melt the thermoplastic material where the metal insert is in contact, and pressure is applied to press it into position. The material typically reforms around the knurled body of the threaded insert to ensure a good retention.

Externally-threaded inserts 

Externally threaded inserts have threads on the outside and inside of the insert. The insert is threaded into a pre-tapped hole, or some inserts tap their own threads in a drilled or molded hole. It is then anchored by various means, such as a nylon locking element. Inserts that are anchored via Loctite are more commonly known by the trademarked name E-Z Lok. A thin walled solid bushing insert by the trademarked name TIME-SERT is locked in by rolling the bottom few internal thread into the base material with a special install driver which will permanently lock the insert in place. Key locking inserts, more commonly known by the trademarked name Keenserts, use keys that are hammered into grooves through the threads, permanently locking the insert. Inserts that are self-tapping and lock via friction are more commonly known by the trademarked names Tap-lok or Speedserts.

Helical insert

A helical insert (also called a screw thread insert (STI), although most users call them all by the prominent brand name, Heli-Coil®) is an insert made of diamond shaped stainless steel, or phosphor bronze, coiled wire. The
coil of wire screws into a threaded hole, where it forms a smaller diameter internal thread for a screw or stud. These inserts provide a convenient means of repairing stripped-out threads. These inserts are commonly sold as kits with matched tap, coil, and insert tool. 

In soft materials, they are used to provide stronger threads than can be obtained by direct tapping of the base materials, e.g. aluminium, zinc die castings, wood, magnesium, plastic.

An example application is engine repair after unintentionally destroying the threads in the socket for a spark plug by over-torquing or by cross-threading.

Mold-in inserts
Mold-in inserts are internally threaded and have a specially shaped outer diameter to anchor the insert in plastic. The insert is placed in the mold of an injection molded part beforehand. The mold is then closed and filled with the plastic filling in around the insert. These inserts can also be heated and pressed into pre-made thermoplastics.

For softer more pliable plastics, hexagonal or square inserts with deep and wide grooves allow the plastic to flow and adhere. The process allows large product manufacture i.e. fuel tanks, boats etc., so the torque inserts may be of large thread sizes.

Press fit inserts

Press fit inserts are internally threaded and have a knurled outer diameter. They are pressed into a plain hole with an arbor press.

Potted inserts
An insert that is potted-in refers to the application of epoxy to fix it to a panel, such as a honeycomb sandwich panel, which are often used in commercial aircraft.

Strength factor for threaded inserts 
Resistance is the key strength factor in case of inserts, pull-out & torque-out are the two parameters to judge inserts.
 Pull-out: the force required to pull the insert out of the parent material.
 Torque-out: the amount of torque required to turn the fastener without inducing any clamp load on the fastener.

Knurling 
Knurling is the metalworking which is done on the outer side of the component. In case of Brass Insert, knurling plays an important role in increasing pull-out & torque-out resistance. Types of knurling and its benefit are as follows:

 Straight knurls: Greatest torque resistance
 Diagonal or helical knurls: Balance resistance in both direction
 Hexagonal or diamond knurl: Most common and offers resistance in all direction

Installation methods 
For industrial purposes, following installation methods are the standards:

 Thermal insertion
 Injection molding
 Manual pressing

See also
 Insert nut
 Nut
 Rivet nut
 Screw
 Screw thread

References

Notes

Bibliography
.
 Sullivan, Gary & Crawford, Lance, "The Heat Stake Advantage". Plastic Decorating Magazine. January/February 2003 Edition. . (Topeka, KS: Peterson Publications, Inc.). Section: Assembly: pages 11–12, covers Sullivan & Crawford's article.

Hardware (mechanical)
Mechanical fasteners